"Didn't It Rain", sometimes given as "Oh, Didn't It Rain", is a spiritual about Noah's flood. In 1919 it appeared as sheet music in an arrangement for voice and piano by Henry Thacker Burleigh (1866–1949).

Modern versions
 The Galilee Singers (1923-1929?)
   Sister Rosetta Tharpe (1948)
 Mahalia Jackson (1955)
 LaVern Baker (1959)
 Fern Jones (1959)
 Dave van Ronk (1964)
  Joe & Eddie (1964)
 Marion Williams (1967)
 Evelyn Freeman Roberts (1962)
 The Band (1973)
 Rev. James Cleveland (1982)
  Tom Jones (2010)
 Johnny Cash (2012)
 Hugh Laurie (2013)
 Amy Helm (2015)
 Glen David Andrews (2014)
 In 2020, Vika and Linda cover the song for their album, Sunday (The Gospel According to Iso).
Jake Blount reworks the song for his album "The New Faith" (2022)

References

Gospel songs
Mahalia Jackson songs
Year of song unknown
Songwriter unknown
African-American spiritual songs